Bow Lake is a lake in Faraday township, Hastings County, Ontario, Canada.

In the late 20th-century, the area around the lake was used for uranium mining and the housing of mine workers.

Description 
The lake is arc shaped, approximately 2.5km in length.

It was named as Bow Lake in 1948 and is located at GPS 45.015613, -77.938345 in Hastings County, Ontario.

History 
The former Faraday Mine (later known as Madawaska Mine) was located North East of the lake. The mine operated from the 1950's to the 1960s and from 1976 to 1982 and produced 4,000,000 tones of tailings that are located in two areas 100 to 200 metres from the shore. Housing for mining company executives were built around the lake's shore.

As of 2012, uranium remained highly bioavailable in the lake as a result of mining activity.

See also 

 List of lakes of Ontario
 Uranium mining in the Bancroft area

References 

Lakes of Hastings County